Cause You're My Boy (also known as "My Tee") is a 2018 Thai television series starring Sattabut Laedeke (Drake) and Thanatsaran Samthonglai (Frank).

Directed by Rachyd Kusolkulsiri and produced by GMMTV together with COSOCOMO, the series was one of the ten television series for 2018 showcased by GMMTV in their "Series X" event on 1 February 2018. It premiered on One31 and LINE TV on 23 June 2018, airing on Saturdays at 22:15 ICT and 23:15 ICT, respectively. The series concluded on 22 September 2018.

Cast and characters

Main 
 Sattabut Laedeke (Drake) as Nueamork "Mork" Jirapakpinit
 Thanatsaran Samthonglai (Frank) as Mungkorn "Tee" Jiaranontanan
 Trai Nimtawat (Neo) as Gord
 Phuwin Tangsakyuen as Morn

Supporting 
 Apichaya Saejung (Ciize) as Ching
 Sutthipha Kongnawdee (Noon) as Bambie
 Phurikulkrit Chusakdiskulwibul (Amp) as Lek
 Chayapol Jutamat (AJ) as Ton
 Chanokwanun Rakcheep (Took) as Dr. Mui
 Thanawat Rattanakitpaisarn (Khaotung) as Au
 Suporn Sangkaphibal as Tee's grandmother

Guest role 
 Kittiphong Lerganjanoi (Win) as Arm (Ep. 1)

Soundtracks

References

External links 
 Cause You're My Boy  on LINE TV
 
 GMMTV

Television series by GMMTV
Thai romantic comedy television series
Thai drama television series
2018 Thai television series debuts
2018 Thai television series endings
One 31 original programming
Television series by Cosocomo
2010s LGBT-related comedy television series
Thai boys' love television series